"Smell of Incense" is a song by the American psychedelic rock band the West Coast Pop Art Experimental Band, written by Ron Morgan and Bob Markley, and was released as a single on Reprise Records in 1968 (see 1968 in music).

Background
An extended version of the song appeared on the group's third album, Vol. 2 (Breaking Through), which was distributed prior to the single. It is considered one of the pinnacles of the band's music catalogue, with it marked by Shaun and Danny Harris's breathy vocal harmonies, and the instrumental interplay between Morgan's distorted guitar-playing coinciding with Shaun Harris's heavy bass sound. Despite the heady atmosphere, the group insists the recording, along with their other self-penned material, was not composed under the influence of LSD. "Smell of Incense", like all of the band's releases, was commercially unsuccessful and failed to chart. The song was later reissued on Hallucinations: Psychedelic Pop Nuggets from the WEA Vaults in 2004.

Southwest F.O.B. recording
In 1968, the West Coast Pop Art Experimental Band was performing at a teen dance club in Dallas called LouAnns with the composition in their set list. A local psychedelic group, Southwest F.O.B. was opening for the band, and was so impressed by the song that they were motivated to record it themselves. Their version was conducted in a similar musical style to its predecessor, but was considerably shorter in comparison to the original album version, with a run-time of two minutes and 40 seconds.   Their version peaked at number 56 on the Hot 100.  The group's version was also included on Southwest F.O.B.'s only album, Smell of Incense. However, the cover art sparked some controversary for its depiction of four nude women, resulting in many record stores refusing to stock the album.

Chart performance

Southwest F.O.B.

References

1967 songs
Reprise Records singles